The 2019–2020 Bikarkeppni karla, named Geysisbikarinn for sponsorship reasons, was the 54th edition of the Icelandic Men's Basketball Cup, won by Stjarnan against Grindavík. The competition was managed by the Icelandic Basketball Federation and the final four was held in Reykjavík, in the Laugardalshöll in February 2020, and was broadcast live on RÚV. Ægir Steinarsson was named the Cup Finals MVP after turning in 19 points and 14 assists.

Participating teams
Twenty-six teams signed up for the Cup tournament.

Bracket

Cup Finals MVP

References

External links
2019–2020 Tournament results

Men's Cup
2019–20 in European basketball leagues